Deborah Chow is a Canadian filmmaker, television director and screenwriter known for her independent films and her work on Star Wars television. Two of her first short films, Daypass (2002) and The Hill (2004) have both won awards at various international film festivals. Her first feature film was The High Cost of Living (2010), which she both wrote and directed.

Chow has directed various projects for television, including the 2014 TV movie adaption of V. C. Andrews' Gothic novel Flowers in the Attic and episodes of the series Copper, Murdoch Mysteries, Reign, Beauty and the Beast, and Mr. Robot. Chow is also a director on the first season of the Star Wars series The Mandalorian (2019) and directed all six episodes of Obi-Wan Kenobi (2022) for Disney+.

Early life
Chow is the half-Chinese daughter of parents who emigrated from Australia to Toronto, Ontario, Canada, where she grew up.

Her Chinese father was an ardent movie fan and introduced to her the world of classic films and filmmaking. Chow graduated from Gordon Graydon Memorial Secondary School in Mississauga, Ontario.

She received her undergraduate degree, major of cultural theory and minor in art history, from McGill University in Montreal, where she made her first short film. After graduation, she went on to complete her MFA in directing at Columbia University's School of the Arts, where she completed two short films and a feature screenplay, including her short film, Daypass, which screened internationally at over 35 festivals and won multiple awards.

Career
Chow began her career writing and directing short films while studying film at university and broke out with her first feature film, The High Cost of Living, in 2010. As a film director, she has worked with notable actors James Urbaniak, Zach Braff and Isabelle Blais, among others.

As a television director, she has worked on the BBC show Copper, the CW programs Reign and Beauty and the Beast, the CBC show Murdoch Mysteries and the USA Network series Mr. Robot. She also directed the adaptation of Flowers in the Attic on Lifetime, which starred Heather Graham and Mad Men's Kiernan Shipka.

Chow served as director of two episodes of the Disney+ exclusive streaming television series, Star Wars: The Mandalorian, in which she also had a cameo role as a New Republic X-wing pilot. She was announced as the sole director for the Disney+ series that centers on Obi-Wan Kenobi. Lucasfilm President Kathleen Kennedy stated that "We really wanted to select a director who is able to explore both the quiet determination and rich mystique of Obi-Wan in a way that folds seamlessly into the Star Wars saga. Based on her phenomenal work developing our characters in The Mandalorian, I'm absolutely confident Deborah is the right director to tell this story."

Chow directed the music video for "Black Summer", the first single off of the Red Hot Chili Peppers 2022 album, Unlimited Love.

Filmography

Film

Television

Music Videos

Acting credits

Awards and recognition
Her short film, Daypass, won the Best Actor Award at the Milano Film Festival and the Best Short at the Turin Film Festival. The feature-length screenplay version of the film won the Comedy Central Award for Best Comedy Screenplay. Chow was the winner of the 2005 Kodak New Vision Mentorship award for her short film The Hill, the winnings from which included funding for her first feature film. She was a participant in the Berlinale Talent Campus, Toronto International Film Festival Talent Lab, and the Praxis Screenwriting Lab. Her debut feature film The High Cost of Living won Best First Feature and Top Ten at the Toronto International Film Festival, Best Canadian Feature at the Female Eye Film Fest, and Prix Super-Écran at the Rendez-vous du cinéma québécois. She received the Andrew Sarris Award at the 2022 Columbia University Film Festival.

Critic response 
The High Cost of Living has received mixed reviews. This film bears all the hallmarks of a conventional indie drama: "a downbeat scenario, flawed protagonists, and a strongly regional inflection." Chow is credited on hitting every mark and narrative turning point. The result is a strange dramatic complexity, with a work of superficial depth.

References

External links
 

Canadian television directors
Canadian women film directors
Canadian people of Chinese descent
21st-century Canadian screenwriters
Film directors from Toronto
Living people
Canadian women television directors
Writers from Toronto
English-language film directors
Canadian women screenwriters
Columbia University School of the Arts alumni
McGill University alumni
1972 births